Lord Suffield is a very large conical (height 76-83mm, width 69-85mm) cooking apple, raised by Thomas Thorpe, from Manchester, United Kingdom. It has been known since 1836. The apple has medium to strong ribbing, and a stalk of approx. 12x4.8mm. The skin is green, with no flush, and the flesh is white and cooks well. It has a wide and deep cavity and around 1-7 pips. The tree is rather small. The apple is picked in late August and can be used from August to November. The parentage is a Peasgood Nonsuch x unknown. It was given the Award of Merit from the Royal Horticultural Society in 1904 and a First Class Certificate from the RHS in 1910. It is susceptible to apple canker.

References

Cooking apples
British apples